Kaw Lake is a reservoir completed in 1976 in the northern reaches of the U.S. state of Oklahoma, near Kaw City which is located on a hill overlooking the lake.

The Reservoir covers approximately 17,040 acres (69 km²).  It is the seventh largest lake in Oklahoma by surface area.  At normal levels, the lake holds  of water, the ninth largest lake in capacity in Oklahoma.  (See List of lakes in Oklahoma) It lies mostly in Kay County and partially in Osage County.

Kaw Dam was authorized by Congress in the Flood Control Act of 1962.  Ground was broken for the dam on May 21, 1966. The original town of Kaw City was covered by the waters of Kaw Lake in 1975. The city was rebuilt about two miles west of the old site during the late 1960s. The dam was completed by the Corps of Engineers in May 1976. The cost of the dam and the lake was $111 million.

The Oklahoma Municipal Power Authority (OMPA), a state governmental agency created in 1981 to provide wholesale electricity to cities and towns in Oklahoma, purchased the substructure of the dam in July 1987 at a cost of $3.8 million and constructed a hydroelectric plant that was completed in September 1989 at a cost of $25 million. Kaw Hydroelectric generates approximately 104 gigawatt hours of energy annually. The plant at Kaw Dam provides power for over 35 municipal electrical systems in Oklahoma and southern Kansas. The project engineer for the Kaw Lake dam was Everette W. Woodham, Jr.

The Corps of Engineers and Camp McFadden offers camping on the west shore of Kaw Lake at Ponca Cove.

The City of Enid began a project in 2020 to lay a 70-mile pipeline to tap Kaw Lake as a  municipal water source.  The project will transport 10 million gallons of water per day.

Camp McFadden 
Camp McFadden is an outdoor recreational area on over  overlooking the west side of Kaw Lake near Ponca City, Oklahoma.   Camp McFadden was created in 1927 as a children's camp by Bill McFadden on the Kygar ranch. The camp includes high and low ropes courses, cabins, a lodge with full kitchen, outdoor activities, and RV and tent camping and is used for team building, reunions, youth and church camps, weddings, and getaways. Future plans include a volleyball court, disc golf, softball field, soccer field and archery range. Camp McFadden is a non-profit 501(c)(3).

References

External links
U.S. Army Corps of Engineers: Kaw Lake
Kaw Lake information and photos on TravelOK.com Official travel and tourism website for the State of Oklahoma
Camp McFadden Recreation Area
Kaw Lake Association
Oklahoma Municipal Power Authority information on Kaw Lake at "operations" tab
Ponca City Tourism
 Oklahoma Digital Maps: Digital Collections of Oklahoma and Indian Territory

Protected areas of Kay County, Oklahoma
Protected areas of Osage County, Oklahoma
Reservoirs in Oklahoma
Dams in Oklahoma
United States Army Corps of Engineers dams
Dams completed in 1976
Bodies of water of Kay County, Oklahoma
Bodies of water of Osage County, Oklahoma